Glendotricha is an extinct genus in the superfamily Pyraloidea. It was described by Kusnezov in 1941, and contains the species G. olgae. It is known from Baltic amber.

References

†
Fossil Lepidoptera
†
Prehistoric insects of Europe